John Lobb Bootmaker is a company that manufactures and retails a luxury brand of shoes and boots, mainly for men but also for women. Leather goods such as wallets and belts are also available. Founded by John Lobb (1829–95), John Lobb Bootmaker has been in business since 1849 in London and circa 1900 in Paris. John Lobb's son William took over the business and after he died in 1916 the business was led by Betsy Lobb.

The original London bespoke workshop at 9 St James's Street remains family-owned and continues to operate independently (as John Lobb Limited). In 1976, the John Lobb Paris shop was acquired by the Hermès Group, which has developed the John Lobb ready-to-wear shoe brand around the world. The two companies continue to maintain their bespoke shoe-making tradition, with the original Lobb family workshop in London and the Hermès owned workshop in Paris.<ref>[https://www.businessoffashion.com/articles/intelligence/john-lobb-scaling-craft-based-business Robin Mellery-Pratt, John Lobb, Scaling a Craft-Based , 07/05/2014 in Business of fashion]</ref>

 History 
John Lobb opened a shop in London in 1866 and produced footwear for European royalty. John died in 1895 but by then his son William had taken over the business. Unusually they did not mechanise like their competitors but stuck to craft techniques. Following the success of the London base, William opened a shop in Paris in 1901 and another (unprofitable) shop in Regent Street, London in 1904.

In 1901 William Lobb married Betsy Smerdon and after the marriage they went on a grand tour. William died in 1916 and it was Betsy who saved the business.

In 1976, Hermès was allowed to use the "John Lobb" name. Only about 100 pairs of ready-to-wear shoes are finished per day. The original, family-owned John Lobb firm still produces handmade shoes one pair at a time. Until the 1980s, John Lobb operated only custom-made activity in London and in Paris. From 1982 onwards, the ready-to-wear activity has complemented the made to measure, and distribution has expanded.

The London company was the subject of a 1945 British Pathé film, Shoes for the Famous, and an episode of the June 2016 BBC Four documentary series, Handmade: By Royal Appointment''.

Present operations 
In 1976, John Lobb Paris became part of the Hermès Group. The London bespoke workshop, John Lobb Limited, remains in the hands of the family and operates independently from its premises at 9 St James's Street.

The ready-to-wear collection debuted in 1982, and the first store showcasing the line opened in 1990 in Paris. In June 2014, the Hermès Group announced the appointment of Paula Gerbase as John Lobb's first ever Artistic Director.

Gallery

References

External links

 John Lobb Limited (at 9 St James's Street, London)
 John Lobb SAS (part of the Hermès Group)

Shoemakers
Shops in London
Shoe brands
Shoe companies of the United Kingdom
Manufacturing companies established in 1849
Retail companies established in 1849
1849 establishments in England
British Royal Warrant holders
Comité Colbert members
English brands
Luxury brands